Susannite is a lead sulfate carbonate hydroxide mineral. It has the formula Pb4SO4(CO3)2(OH)2. Susannite is the higher temperature phase of the two and forms above 80 °C when fluids oxidize the lead ore deposits. It is trimorphous with leadhillite and macphersonite.
 
Susannite crystallizes in the trigonal system. It is quite soft with a Mohs hardness of 2.5 to 3.0 and a relatively high specific gravity of 6.57.

It was discovered in 1827 in the Susannah Mine, Leadhills in the county of Lanark, Scotland. In addition to the type locality in Scotland, it has also been reported from various locations in Germany, the Tiger Mine in Pinal County, Arizona, from Iporanga, Sao Paulo, Brazil, and the Tsumeb mine of Namibia.

See also
Lanarkite
Leadhillite

References

Mineral galleries

Lead minerals
Carbonate minerals
Trigonal minerals
Minerals in space group 148